Tetrachlorozincate is an anion with the formula [ZnCl4]2−.  It is a counterion that is often used in conjunction with strong electrophiles.  Being dianionic, tetrachlorozincate is not classified as a weakly coordinating anion.  On the other hand, being dianionic, tetrachlorozincate facilitates the crystallization of many salts. It has a tetrahedral molecular geometry. A simple example is (NH4)2[ZnCl4].  The anion is tetrahedral.  Zincates are anionic zinc complexes.

Related to the preparation of Lucas' reagent, tetrachlorozincates are often generated by combining hydrochloric acid and zinc chloride.

A related anion is [Zn2Cl6]2−, in which again Zn(II) adopts a tetrahedral geometry.

References